The Itaboraí Formation is a highly fossiliferous geologic formation and Lagerstätte of the Itaboraí Basin in Rio de Janeiro, southeastern Brazil.

The formation overlies Precambrian basement and is overlain by Early Eocene basalts and Late Eocene to Early Oligocene conglomerates.

Several genera and species were named after the formation; the marsupials Itaboraidelphys camposi and Carolopaulacoutoia itaboraiensis, the birds Itaboravis elaphrocnemoides, Eutreptodactylus itaboraiensis and Eutreptodactylus itaboraiensis, the snake Itaboraiophis depressus and the caiman Eocaiman itaboraiensis and the gastropods Itaborahia lamegoi, Biomphalaria itaboraiensis and Gastrocopta itaboraiensis.

The formation is the richest Cenozoic fossiliferous formation of Brazil, leading to the establishment of the Parque Paleontológico de São José de Itaboraí ("São José de Itaboraí Paleontological Park") in 1995. The site is a candidate for becoming a UNESCO World Heritage Site.

Etymology 
The word "Itaboraí" is of Tupi origin, and has two possible etymologies:
 "River of beautiful stones", a combination of the words itá (stone), porã (beautiful) and y (river)
 "River of brilliant stones", derived from the words itá (stone), berab (brilliant) and y (river)

Description 
Between 1933 and 1984, a local cement company exploited the rocks in the area and their workers discovered the first fossil remains in the formation. The now abandoned and largely inaccessible limestone quarries of this locality have yielded a diverse mammalian fauna from early late Paleocene fissure fillings. The sediments of the formation were described by Leinz in 1938. Presently, the basin is filled up with water impeding any collecting activity.

Basin history 
The small basin, a small half-graben, is the oldest and smallest of several Cenozoic rift basins stretching across  along a west-southwest to east-northeast trend between the Paraná Basin to the northwest and the Santos Basin to the southeast, separated by the Serra da Mantiqueira and Serra do Mar respectively. This Continental Rift of Southern Brazil (CRSB) comprises the Curitiba, São Paulo, Taubaté, Resende, Volta Redonda, Macacu, Barra de São João and Itaboraí Basins. 

An erosional surface, correlated with a 55 Ma sea-level lowstand representing the Paleocene-Eocene transition and associated with magmatism, has been recorded in the various Atlantic marginal basins along the Brazilian coast; Pelotas, Santos, Campos, Espírito Santo, Cumuruxatiba, Jequitinhonha and Mucuri Basins.

Stratigraphy 

The Itaboraí Formation rests unconformably on top of the Precambrian Paraíba do Sul Group, part of the Meso- to Neoproterozoic Paraíba do Sul Complex.

 Sequence 1 (S1) - clastic limestones with travertine, grey carbonates and oolitic limestones, carbonatic shales and lignites, deposited in a lacustrine environment, originating from debris flows in a tectonic lake. From this sequence gastropods are abundant, while woods, reptiles and mammals are scarce.
 Sequence 2 (S2) - carbonates filling caverns and dissolution cracks on a karstic surface of Sequence 1, comprising fossiliferous marls, deposited in an alluvial to lacustrine environment, transported into these cavities by heavy rains and gravitational flows
 Sequence 3 (S3) - terrestrial siliciclastic sediments, including mudstones, sandstones and sandy conglomerates of Late Eocene to Early Oligocene age, derived from the surrounding basement gneisses, deposited by mudflows in a subaerial alluvial fan environment. These sediments, referred to as the Rio Frio Formation, have been correlated with the Eocene to Oligocene Resende Formation of the eponymous basin.

The Itaboraí Formation is separated from Sequence 3 by basaltic volcanic rocks, formed in the Early Eocene.

Thin section analysis suggests the travertine sequence went through a series of diagenetic processes: firstly, the deposition of the primary carbonate, followed by a set of percolating iron oxide enriched fluids and lastly a set of silica-rich fluids leading to the silica chalcedony and micro-crystalline deposition.

Age 

The Itaboraí Formation, defining the Itaboraian SALMA, was first thought to be early to mid Paleocene in age, until dating performed by Woodburne et al. in 2014 suggested as a more probable early Eocene age (53–50 Ma), spanning polarity chron 23. The overlying basalts have been dated to the Early Eocene (52.6 ± 2.4 Ma). Another very important source of data is palynological analysis of a coal-bearing horizon (lignite) interlayered with alluvial fan deposits at the northern border of the Itaboraí Basin, suggesting a Paleocene to Eocene age. During this time, a biogeographical connection existed with Antarctica and, though separated by the developing South Atlantic, with Africa. The deposits of the formation were formed during the Early Eocene Climatic Optimum (EECO), just after the Paleocene-Eocene Thermal Maximum.

Paleontological significance 

The Itaboraí Formation is the richest and one of few formations in Brazil providing Paleogene mammal faunas, between the older Tiupampan Maria Farinha Formation of the Parnaíba Basin and the younger Divisaderan Guabirotuba Formation of the Curitiba Basin, the Tinguirirican Entre-Córregos Formation of the Aiuruoca Basin and the Deseadan Tremembé Formation of the Taubaté Basin.

Despite its relatively small size, the São José de Itaboraí Basin comprises a diversified fossil assemblage. Among the groups found there, fossil birds are very rare, mainly due to their pneumatized bones. Only three bird species have been described up to this moment from the Itaboraí Basin. Diogenornis fragilis, a probable ratite ancestor, stands out for its good preservation and the number of specimens preserved. In the Paleocene of the southern hemisphere, small terrestrial birds have only been discovered in the late Paleocene fissure fillings of the Itaboraí Formation.

The relative fossil diversity of the Itaboraí Formation at family level consists of 44% mammals, 23% mollusks, 14% reptiles (lizards, chelonians, crocodyliforms), 7% birds, 5% amphibians and 7%
plants. Fish are one of the few groups not found to date in the lacustrine formation. The formation has provided many marsupials and related metatherians. The species Lamegoia conodonta is the largest "condylarth" at Itaboraí and approximates the size of a wolf. Ricardocifellia protocenica, originally described as Paulacoutoia protocenica, is the smallest of the "condylarth" species of Itaboraí, but the most abundant. The most abundant litoptern found in the formation is Protolipterna ellipsodontoides.

Sequence 1 of the formation has provided many land snails, among which several new species. The records of Itaboraí are the oldest for the genera Austrodiscus, Brachypodella, Bulimulus, Cecilioides, Cyclodontina, Eoborus, Gastrocopta, Leiostracus, Plagiodontes and Temesa. Also, the formation contains the oldest record for the families Orthalicidae, Gastrocoptidae, Ferussaciidae and Strophocheilidae.

Several genera and species were named after the formation; the marsupials Itaboraidelphys camposi and Carolopaulacoutoia itaboraiensis, the birds Itaboravis elaphrocnemoides, Eutreptodactylus itaboraiensis and Eutreptodactylus itaboraiensis, the snake Itaboraiophis depressus and crocodile Eocaiman itaboraiensis and the gastropods Itaborahia lamegoi, Biomphalaria itaboraiensis and Gastrocopta itaboraiensis.

Because of its paleontological importance, the Itaboraí Basin area was designated as a paleontological park in 1995: Parque Paleontológico de São José de Itaboraí ("São José de Itaboraí Paleontological Park"). The park was established to preserve the geology and highlight the importance of the paleontological richness of the area.

The formation is named as one of the fossil sites of potential World Heritage Value by the IUCN in 1996.

Fossil content 
Fossils recovered from the formation include:

Itaboraian correlations

See also 
 South American land mammal ages
 Iguape Formation, contemporaneous formation of the Santos Basin
 Laguna del Hunco Formation, contemporaneous fossiliferous formation of the Cañadón Asfalto Basin, Argentina
 Lefipan Formation, pre-Tiupampan fossiliferous lacustrine formation of the Cañadón Asfalto Basin, Argentina
 Bogotá Formation, contemporaneous fossiliferous formation of central Colombia
 Green River Formation, contemporaneous fossiliferous formation of Colorado, Wyoming and Utah
 Klondike Mountain Formation, contemporaneous fossiliferous formation of Washington State
 La Meseta Formation, contemporaneous fossiliferous formation of Antarctica

References

Bibliography 
General
  
  
  
  
 

Geology
 
 
  
  
  

Paleontology
 
 
 
 
 
 
  
 
 
  
 
 
 
 
 
 
 
 
 
 
 
 
 
 
 
 
 
 
 
 
 
 
 

 
Geologic formations of Brazil
Eocene Series of South America
Paleogene Brazil
 
Ypresian Stage
Limestone formations
Marl formations
Coal formations
Alluvial deposits
Lacustrine deposits
Fossiliferous stratigraphic units of South America
Paleontology in Brazil
Formations
Tupi–Guarani languages